The Set Decorators Society of America Awards 2021 will honor the best set decorators in film and television in 2021. The nominations for the film categories were announced on January 17, 2022, while the winners were announced via YouTube on February 22, 2022.

The nominations for the television categories were announced on June 15, 2022, while the winners are set to be announced via YouTube on August 2, 2022.

Winners and nominees

Film

Television

References

External links
 

2021 film awards
2021 in American cinema